2021 MUAHS Guild Awards
February 19, 2022

Contemporary: 

Coming 2 America

Period/Character:

Being the RicardosCruella
The 14th Make-Up Artists and Hair Stylists Guild Awards are presented by the Make-Up Artists and Hair Stylists Guild to honor the best make-up and hairstyling in film and television for 2021, the winners were announced on February 19, 2022, at the Beverly Hilton Hotel. Make-up artist Michèle Burke and hairstylist Joy Zapata received the Lifetime Achievement Award.

The nominations were announced on January 11, 2022.

Winners and nominees
The winners are listed first and in bold.

Feature-Length Motion Picture

Television Series, Limited or Miniseries or Television New Media Series

Television Special, One Hour or More Live Program  Series or Movie for Television

Daytime Television

Children and Teen Television Programming

Commercials and Music Videos

Theatrical Productions (Live Stage)

References

2021
Awards established in 2014